A constitutional referendum was held in Kyrgyzstan on 17 October 1998. The main provisions of the referendum were the introduction of the private ownership of land for citizens of Kyrgyzstan; a change in the distribution of seats in parliament - increasing number of seats in Legislative Assembly from 35 to 60 and reducing the number of seats in Assembly of People's Representatives from 70 to 45, removing the right of MPs to alter the national budget without the government's approval, increasing the freedom of independent media of Kyrgyzstan, and limiting the level of legal immunity awarded to MPs.

The changes were approved by 95.4% of voters, with turnout reported to be 96.4%.

Results

References

External links
Election Guide

Referendums in Kyrgyzstan
1998 in Kyrgyzstan
1998 referendums
Constitutional referendums in Kyrgyzstan